This is a list of notable crossings of the Atlantic Ocean.

Post-1492 crossings

15th to 18th centuries
 In May 1497, Italian explorer John Cabot set sail from Bristol, England, in service of King Henry VII, arriving in what is believed to be Newfoundland, Labrador or Cape Breton, Canada in June of that year. Believing it to be Asia, he surveyed the coastline before sailing back to England. He made a second voyage the year after but never returned.
 In April 1563, Nicolas Barre and 20 other stranded Huguenots were the first to build a (crude) boat in the Americas and sail across the Atlantic. They sailed from Charlesfort, South Carolina to just off the coast of England where they were rescued by an English ship. Though they resorted to cannibalism, seven men survived the voyage, including Barre.
 English soldier and courtier Sir Humphrey Gilbert sailed across the Atlantic in 1583, landing in what is now St. John's, Canada and claiming the land for England. His ship sank somewhere off the Azores during the return voyage and he drowned.
 On 16 September 1620 (New Style), the sailing ship Mayflower, carrying English and Dutch Pilgrims on board, set sail from England to North America, reaching New England on 21 November (New Style) the same year.

19th century
 In 1870, the small City of Ragusa of Liverpool became the first small lifeboat to cross the Atlantic from Queenstown, County Cork to Boston with two crew, John Charles Buckley and Nikola Primorac (di Costa).

20th century
 On 15 April 1912 the RMS Titanic sank after hitting an iceberg with a loss of more than 1,500 lives.
 1939–1945, during World War II, the Battle of the Atlantic resulted in nearly 3,700 ships sunk and 783 U-boats destroyed.
 In 1952, Ann Davison was the first woman to single-handedly sail the Atlantic Ocean.
 In 1965, Robert Manry crossed the Atlantic from the U.S. to England non-stop in a  sailboat named Tinkerbelle. Several others also crossed the Atlantic in very small sailboats in the 1960s, none of them non-stop, though.
 In 1969 and 1970 Thor Heyerdahl launched expeditions to cross the Atlantic in boats built from papyrus.
 In 1984, five Argentines sail in a  raft made from tree trunks named Atlantis from Canary Islands and after 52 days  journey arrived to Venezuela in an attempt to prove travellers from Africa may have crossed the Atlantic before Christopher Columbus.
 In 1985, American boatbuilder, Al Grovers, Sr., made the first outboard crossing of the Atlantic.

21st century
 In August 2019, the Swedish climate activist Greta Thunberg, her father and three crew members made a crossing of the Atlantic from Plymouth to New York in 15 days on board the Malizia II. The voyage generated all of its power during the crossing using solar power and an under-water turbine.

See also
 História trágico-marítima
 Portuguese India Armadas

References

History of the Atlantic Ocean
Transatlantic relations
Transport in the Atlantic Ocean